Douglas Thomas Fearon FRS FRCP FMedSci (born 16 October 1942) is an American medical immunologist, who has been since 2003 Sheila Joan Smith Professor of Immunology at the University of Cambridge, a fellow of Trinity College, Cambridge, and a professor at Cold Spring Harbor Laboratory.

Awards and honours
Fearon was elected a Fellow of the Royal Society (FRS) in 1999 and is also member of the United States National Academy of Sciences. His nomination for the Royal Society reads:

References 

1942 births
Living people
Fellows of the Royal Society
Members of the United States National Academy of Sciences
Fellows of the Royal College of Physicians
Fellows of the Academy of Medical Sciences (United Kingdom)
Fellows of Trinity College, Cambridge
American medical researchers
American immunologists
Professors of the University of Cambridge